Oakland Township is one of twelve townships in Burt County, Nebraska, United States. The population was 124 at the 2020 census. A 2021 estimate placed the township's population at 124.

See also
County government in Nebraska

References

External links
City-Data.com

Townships in Burt County, Nebraska
Townships in Nebraska